"Damn!" is a song by the Atlanta rap duo YoungBloodZ. It was released as the second single from their second studio album Drankin' Patnaz and was produced by Lil Jon who is also featured on the song. A club mix appears on the duo's third studio album. It is their biggest hit to date, peaking at number 4 on the U.S. Billboard Hot 100, YoungBloodZ's sole top 10 single on the chart.

Background
While recording the album, the group didn’t feel like it had any singles so they contacted Jermaine Dupri who was executive producing the project, to go back into the recording studio. The duo's attorney, Vince Phillips, who also a business partner and friend of the producer Lil Jon called him in to producer the new track for the duo. "Instantly, man, we knew it was the one. You could tell by the energy in the room" says J-Bo. 

Lil Jon's BME Recording artist, Bohagon was in attendance and wrote the hook for the song.

Reception
Ranked #47 on Complex Magazines Best 100 Songs of 2000s,  the single won Single of the Year/Collaboration at the 2004 Source Awards. The songwriters also won ASCAP and BMI awards for the song in the same year,  and was also nominated for Top R&B/Hip-Hop Singles, Top R&B/Hip-Hop Singles-Airplay and Hot Rap Tracks at the 2004 Hip-Hop/R&B Billboard Awards.

In 2018, the song was featured in an episode of the ABC TV series, Single Parents.

Track listing
CD single
"Damn!" (Radio edit)
"Damn!" (Album version)

Digital download
"Damn!" (Single version)

Remix
The official remix is called "Damn! (So So Def Remix)", and features Lil Jon, Ludacris, Jermaine Dupri, & Bone Crusher.
An underground version featuring Young Buck and Fabolous is also available.

Charts

Weekly charts

Year-end charts

References

2003 singles
YoungBloodZ songs
Lil Jon songs
Songs written by Lil Jon
Song recordings produced by Lil Jon
Crunk songs